, better known by his stage name , was a Japanese actor and TV personality.

Death
On 22 April 2015, two weeks after his 62nd birthday, Hagiwara died in a road accident in Suginami, Tokyo, while riding his motorbike.

Filmography

Cinema

 Fall Guy (1982) - Yuji
 Legend of the Eight Samurai (1983) - Yōnosuke
 Usugeshô (1985) - Tateishi
 Kizudarake no kunshô (1986) - Kataoka
 Jittemai (1986)
 Sukeban Deka the Movie 2: Counter-Attack from the Kazama Sisters (1988) - Yoda
 Onimaru (1988) - Hidemaru
 Asobi no jikan wa owaranai (1991) - Local TV Producer
 Kantsubaki (1992) - Tamura
 Kowagaru hitobito (1994) - Station employee A
 Ai no shinsekai (1994) - Sawanobori
 Mâkusu no yama (1995)
 Gokudo no onna-tachi: Akai kizuna (1995) - Shuzo Goto
 Joker (1998) - Ara
 Gunro no keifu (1999) - Shinjo
 Sagishi ippei (1999) - Ippei
 Sagishi ippei 2 (2000) - Ippei
 Sagishi ippei 3 (2000) - Ippei
 Gin no otoko 2 (2001)
 Hoshi ni negai wo (2003)
 Waru (2006)
 Kuishimbô! ohgui kaigan hen (2007) - Hunter george
 Famîyu: Furansupan to watashi (2008)
 Hitomi o tojite (2013) - Jin

TV drama
 Sukeban Deka III (1986-1987, TV Movie)
 Garo Gold Storm Sho (2015) (Principal)

References

External links
  
 

1953 births
Male actors from Tokyo
2015 deaths
Road incident deaths in Japan
Motorcycle road incident deaths
20th-century Japanese male actors
21st-century Japanese male actors